Aktiebolag ("stock company") is the Swedish term for "limited company" or "corporation". When used in company names, it is abbreviated AB (in Sweden), Ab (in Finland), or, rarely, A/B (dated), roughly equivalent to the abbreviations Ltd. and PLC. The state authority responsible for registration of aktiebolag in Sweden is called the Swedish Companies Registration Office.

Sweden 

All aktiebolag are divided into two categories: private limited companies  and public limited companies.  The name of a private limited company may not contain the word publikt ("public") and the name of a public limited company may not contain the word privat or pvt. ("private").

Public 
A public limited company (publikt aktiebolag) is legally denoted as "AB (publ.)" in Sweden or "Abp" in Finland. A Swedish public limited company must have a minimum share capital of 500,000 Swedish kronor and its shares can be offered to the general public on the stock market. The suffix "(publ.)" is sometimes omitted in texts of an informal nature, but according to the Swedish Companies Registration Office, "the name of a public limited company must be mentioned with the term (publ.) after the business name in the articles of association and elsewhere", unless it is clearly understood from the company’s business name that the company is a public limited company.

Private 
For a private limited company in Sweden (privat aktiebolag), the minimum share capital is 25,000 Swedish kronor. 
The main Swedish statutes regulating limited companies are The Companies Act (Aktiebolagslagen (ABL) 2005:551) and The Limited Companies Ordinance (Aktiebolagsförordningen 2005:559). The law provisions in ABL stipulate that parent companies and subsidiaries are separate legal persons and legal entities.

Examples 
The abbreviation AB is seen in company names such as EA Digital Illusions CE AB, Ericsson AB, MySQL AB, Mojang AB, Spotify AB, Scania AB, Hi3G Access AB, and originally, Svenska Aeroplan AB (SAAB). Other companies have included this into their abbreviated trading name, for example SSAB AB (formerly Svenskt Stål AB), HIAB (Hydrauliska Industri AB), ESAB (Elektriska Svetsnings-Aktiebolaget) and LKAB (Luossavaara-Kiirunavaara Aktiebolag).

Finland 

The term aktiebolag is also used in Finland Swedish, alongside the Finnish osakeyhtiö; the choice and ordering of terms tends to indicate the company's primary working language.

References

External links
Swedish Companies Registration Office

Types of business entity
Economy of Sweden
Law of Sweden